The 1998 UEFA European Under-21 Championship, which spanned two years (1996–98), had 46 entrants.  Before the quarter-finals stage, Romania were chosen as the hosts of the final stages, consisting of four matches in total.

The exclusion (for political reasons) of the team from Serbia and Montenegro, then known as the Federal Republic of Yugoslavia ended. Bosnia and Herzegovina was another former state of Yugoslavia who competed, for the first time. Spain won the competition for the second time.

The 46 national teams were divided into nine groups (eight groups of 5 + one group of 6). The records of the nine group winners were compared, and the eighth and ninth ranked teams played-off against each other for the eight quarter finals spot.  One of the eight quarter-finalist were then chosen to host the remaining fixtures.

Qualification

The qualifying stage for the 1998 UEFA European Under-21 Championship saw Germany, Netherlands, Norway, Romania, Russia, Spain and Sweden win their respective groups. Greece and England finished first in their group but were the two worst first placed group winners. Greece defeated England in a playoff to qualify for the tournament.

Qualified teams

1 Bold indicates champion for that year

Venues
The final tournament was held in Bucharest, the hosts being only three arenas.

Match officials

Squads

Only players born on or after 1 January 1975 were eligible to play in the tournament. Each nation had to submit a squad of 20 players, two of which had to be goalkeepers. If a player was injured seriously enough to prevent his taking part in the tournament before his team's first match, he can be replaced by another player.

Results

Bracket

Quarter-finals

5th-8th places

Semi-finals

7th place

5th place

Third place

Final

References

External links 
Results archive at UEFA.com
RSSSF Results archive at RSSSF

 
UEFA European Under-21 Championship
1998
UEFA
UEFA
1996–97 in Romanian football
1997–98 in Romanian football
May 1998 sports events in Europe
1998 in youth association football